Campbell Field may refer to:

 Campbell Field Airport, a public use airport in Weirwood, Virginia, United States
 Bruce Campbell Field, a public use airport in Madison, Mississippi, United States
 Campbell Army Airfield, a military airport at Fort Campbell, Kentucky, United States
 Campbell's Field, a former baseball park in Camden, New Jersey, United States
 Campbell Field, a football field in Golden Colorado, United States